Dragon, in comics, may refer to:
 Dragon, the leading character in the Image Comics title Savage Dragon
 Dragon (DC Comics), a DC Comics character
 Dragon, a member of Gen13
 Dragon Comics, a Japanese comic magazine
 Richard Dragon, a Marvel Comics character
 Dragon Man (character), a Marvel Comics character

It may also refer to:
 Dragon Ball (manga), a Japanese manga series
 Dragon's Claws, a Marvel UK title
 Dragon Lady Press, a comics publisher
 Dragon Lord (comics), a number of Marvel Comics characters
 Dragonmage, a DC Comics character
 Dragon Prince (comics)
 Dragon Shiryū, a Saint Seiya character
 Black Dragon Society (comics)
 Crouching Tiger, Hidden Dragon (comics)
 Red Dragon (comics), a number of characters
 She-Dragon, an Image Comics character

See also
 Dragon (disambiguation)